National mysticism (German Nationalmystik) or mystical nationalism is a form of nationalism which raises the nation to the status of numen or divinity. Its best known instance is Germanic mysticism, which gave rise to occultism under the Third Reich. The idea of the nation as a divine entity was presented by Johann Gottlieb Fichte. National mysticism is closely related to Romantic nationalism, but goes beyond the expounding of romantic sentiment, to a mystical veneration of the nation as a transcendent truth. It often intersects with ethnic nationalism by pseudohistorical assertions about the origins of a given ethnicity.

National mysticism is encountered in many nationalisms other than Germanic or Nazi mysticism and expresses itself in the use of occult, pseudoscientific, or pseudohistorical beliefs to back up nationalistic claims, often involving unrealistic notions of the antiquity of a nation (antiquity frenzy) or any national myth defended as "true" by pseudo-scholarly means.

Notable examples 

 State Shinto in Japan prior to the forced secularization following World War II.
 The Sun Language Theory in Pan-Turkism
 Kurdish nationalists often make the claim that they are the descendants of the Medes
 Polish Sarmatism and later Christ of Europe concept
 Greek Epsilonism
 Indonesian nationalism
 Some branches of revisionist history theories of Bulgarians and Bulgaria (i.e. "Thracomania") and Macedonian nationalist history theories
 Narratives on the origin of the Albanians in Albanian nationalism 
 The Croat Illyrian movement
 Romanian protochronism and Dacianism
 Philippine Destiny
 The Battle of Kosovo as the national myth in Serbian nationalism
 American Manifest Destiny
 The Indigenous Aryans theory in Hindu nationalism
 Currents of Tamil nationalism (as in Devaneya Pavanar)
 Claims of interplanetary travel, possible existence of in-vitro fertilization and genetic engineering by ancient Indians (102nd Indian Science Congress) 
 Some currents of Armenian nationalism (see Armenia, Subartu and Sumer)
 Currents of Russian nationalism
 Kabbalistic currents in religious Zionism
 Swedish Gothicism
 Hungarian Holy Crown Doctrine
 The Spain destiny in Falangism
In a 2004 article, David Gelernter described Ronald Reagan as a "mystic nationalist"
Irish author George William Russell has been described as a "prophet of mystic nationalism"
Jews as the chosen people in Judaism

See also 
 National myth
 Christian mysticism
 Religion in national symbols

References